Costigo is a genus of minute, air-breathing land snails, terrestrial pulmonate gastropod molluscs or micromolluscs in the family Vertiginidae, the whorl snails.

Species
Species within the  genus Costigo include:
 Costigo calamianica (Möllendorff, 1898)
 Costigo desmazuresi (Crosse, 1873)
 Costigo saparuana (Boettger, 1891)
Species brought into synonymy
 Costigo borbonica (H. Adams, 1868): synonym of Gibbulinopsis pupula (Deshayes, 1863) (junior synonym)
 Costigo moleculina van Benthem Jutting, 1940: synonym of Pupisoma moleculina (van Benthem Jutting, 1940) (original combination)
 Costigo pulvisculum (Issel, 1874): synonym of Pupisoma pulvisculum (Issel, 1874) (superseded combination)

References

 Crosse, H., 1873. Diagnoses Molluscorum novorum. Journal de Conchyliologie 21: 136-144
 Bank, R. A. (2017). Classification of the Recent terrestrial Gastropoda of the World. Last update: July 16, 2017

External links 
 
 Boettger, O. (1891). Ad. Strubell´s Konchylien aus Java II und von den Molukken. Bericht über die Senckenbergische Naturforschende Gesellschaft in Frankfurt am Main. 1891: 241-318, pl. 3-4

Vertiginidae
Taxonomy articles created by Polbot